La Liste which initially was a list of the 1,000 best restaurants in the world is privately owned and was launched in Paris in December 2015. This French ranking and restaurants guide nowadays lists 20,000 restaurants in 195 countries by aggregating over 700 guides and publication and is often cited as the reply to British published gastronomic guide World’s 50 Best Restaurants. La Liste guide and results are available on laliste.com and through La Liste app (iOS and Android)

Founder of La Liste, Ambassador Philippe Faure, was previously CEO of Gault & Millau, and former Head of the French Tourist Board, and served as Ambassador of France to Japan from 2007 to 2011, to Mexico and to Morocco. Corporate sponsors of La Liste include Moët Hennessy, American Express, ABInbev, Marché International de Rungis and Accor Hotels.

Methodology
La Liste is compiled using a data processing algorithm. The list factors in more than 700 international dining guides, crowd-sourced sites (such as Yelp and TripAdvisor) or press reviews (New York Times, Washington Post...). Among those sources, La Liste also takes into consideration Zagat, Michelin, the James Beard Award, Gault & Millau, OpenTable.

LA LISTE 2023

LA LISTE 2019

LA LISTE 2017 
The 2017 ranking was released on December 5, 2016 in Paris. Restaurants are now rated on a Parker-style scale ranging from 80 to 100, with 0,25 increments. Japan is still in the lead with 116 restaurants in the top 1000, followed by France with 113 and China with 100. Actual number of restaurants listed is 1,076 because the score 83.25 is shared by 87 restaurants from rank 990 to 1,076.

LA LISTE 2016 
Japan tops the list with 127 restaurants followed by France with 118 and the United States with 101.

External links
 Official website

See also

World’s 50 Best Restaurants
List of Michelin starred restaurants
Lists of restaurants

References

Restaurant guides
Food and drink awards
Lists of restaurants